Squirrel Creek is a  long 2nd order tributary to Reedy Fork in Guilford County, North Carolina.

Course
Squirrel Creek rises on the Mears Fork divide about 5 miles west of Browns Summit, North Carolina in Guilford County.  Squirrel Creek then flows south and then turns east to drain into Lake Townsend, where it meets Reedy Fork.

Watershed
Squirrel Creek drains  of area, receives about 45.7 in/year of precipitation, has a topographic wetness index of 432.80 and is about 49% forested.

References

Rivers of North Carolina
Rivers of Guilford County, North Carolina